René Mertens (3 March 1922 – 9 April 2014) was a Belgian racing cyclist. He rode in the 1948 Tour de France.

References

External links
 

1922 births
2014 deaths
Belgian male cyclists
People from Arendonk
Cyclists from Antwerp Province